Safe Harbor is an American drama television series that aired on The WB from September 20 to November 28, 1999. The series was created and executive produced by Brenda Hampton, who at the time was best known for work on the fellow WB series 7th Heaven, the series was paired with 7th Heaven on the network's Monday night lineup. Despite 7th Heaven being the No. 1 show on The WB during the 1999-2000 season, Safe Harbor was unable to hold a solid audience after 7th Heaven and was canceled after ten episodes and one season with the show moving to Sunday nights where the last two episodes aired.

Premise
John Loring (Gregory Harrison) is the sheriff of a local Florida town named Magic Beach. He is a widower who has his hands full finding the truth behind his wife's death and raising his three sons Hayden (Christopher Khayman Lee), Turner (Jeremy Lelliott) and Jeff (Jamie Williams). Jeff is best friends with Chris (Orlando Brown) and Jamie (Chyler Leigh) is a runaway that John cares for. Helping John raise his kids is his eccentric mother Grandma Loring (Rue McClanahan) who runs the local beach-side motel.

Cast
 Gregory Harrison as Sheriff John Loring
 Rue McClanahan as Grandma Loring
 Christopher Khayman Lee as Hayden Loring
 Jeremy Lelliott as Turner Loring
 Jamie Williams as Jeff Loring
 Orlando Brown as Chris
 Chyler Leigh as Jamie Martin
 Deborah Magdalena as Deputy Lopez 
 Anthony Hubert as Deputy Chafin

Episodes

References

External links
 
 

1990s American drama television series
1999 American television series debuts
1999 American television series endings
English-language television shows
Television series by CBS Studios
Television series by Spelling Television
Television shows set in Florida
The WB original programming
Television series created by Brenda Hampton